Lloyd Stephen Riford Jr. (born February 29, 1924) is an American politician from New York.

Early life and education
He was born on February 29, 1924, in Auburn, New York, the son of Lloyd Stephen Riford Sr. (1889–1980). He attended Phillips Exeter Academy. During World War II he served as an ambulance driver with the American Field Service. He earned an A.B. from Princeton University in 1948.

Career 
After graduating from college, Riford worked in dairy farming. He was a member of the New York State Assembly from 1971 to 1982, sitting in the 179th, 180th, 181st, 182nd, 183rd and 184th New York State Legislatures. He was then a member of the New York State Senate from 1983 to 1986, sitting in the 185th and 186th New York State Legislatures. He was Chairman of the Committee on Agriculture.

In 1986, he received the Rhea Eckel Clark Citizenship Award from the Central New York Regional Planning and Development Board.

After retiring from politics, Riford moved to Kihei, Maui, Hawaii, and engaged in agricultural pursuits there.

References

External links
 World War II Oral History Project: Lloyd S. Riford, Jr.

1924 births
Living people
Politicians from Auburn, New York
Republican Party members of the New York State Assembly
Republican Party New York (state) state senators
Phillips Exeter Academy alumni
Princeton University alumni